Modes of transport in the Central African Republic include road, water, and air. Most the country is connected to the road network, but not all of it. Some roads in the country do not connect to the rest of the national road network and may become impassable, especially during heavy monsoon rain. Many remote areas that not connected to the country's road network, especially in the eastern part of the country outside of the major cities and towns, can only be reached by light aircraft, boat (via river) or on foot. Most roads are unpaved, and which centres on the routes nationales identified as RN1 to RN11. Bangui serves as a seaport, and 900 km of inland waterways are navigable, the main route being the Oubangui river. There is one international airport at Bangui-Mpoko, two other paved airports, and over 40 with unpaved runways.

Railways 

There are presently no railways in the Central African Republic.

A line from  Cameroon port of Kribi to Bangui was proposed in 2002.

Highways 

 Total: 23,810 km
 Paved: 643 km
 Unpaved: 23,167 km (1999 est.)

Major roads include:
 RN1 (Route Nationale 1) north from Bangui. 482 km via Bossangoa to Moundou, Chad.
 RN2 east from Bangui. 1202 km via Bambari and Bangassou to the South Sudanese border at Bambouti.
 RN3 west from RN1 at Bossembélé. 453 km via Bouar and Baboua to Boulai on the Cameroon border as part of the east-west Trans-African Highway 8 Lagos-Mombasa.
 RN4 from RN2 at Damara, 76 km north of Bangui, north 554 km via Bouca and Batangafo to Sarh, Chad.
 RN6 south and west from Bangui, 605 km via Mbaïki, Carnot and Berbérati to Gamboula on the border with Cameroon.
 RN8 north-east from RN2 at Sibut, 023 km via Kaga Bandoro, Ndéle, and Birao to the Sudanese border.
 RN10 south from RN6 at Berbérati, 136 km via Bania to Nola.
 RN11 from Baoro on RN3 south, 104 km to Carnot on RN6.

The roads east to Sudan and north to Chad are poorly maintained.

Waterways 
900 km; traditional trade carried on by means of shallow-draft dugouts; Oubangui is the most important river, navigable all year to craft drawing 0.6 m or less; 282 km navigable to craft drawing as much as 1.8 m.

Ports and harbors 
There is only one river port. It is at the city of Bangui.

Airports

Airports with paved runways 
 Total: 3
 2,438 to 3,047 m: 1
 1,524 to 2,437 m: 2 (2002)

The most important airport in the Central African Republic is Bangui M'Poko International Airport (ICAO: FEFF)

Airports with unpaved runways 
 Total: 47
 2,438 to 3,047 m: 1
 1,524 to 2,437 m: 10
 914 to 1,523 m: 23
 Under 914 m: 13 (2002)

See also 
 Central African Republic

References

External links 
 UN Map